The gravitational constant (also known as the universal gravitational constant, the Newtonian constant of gravitation, or the Cavendish gravitational constant), denoted by the capital letter , is an empirical physical constant involved in the calculation of gravitational effects in Sir Isaac Newton's law of universal gravitation and in Albert Einstein's theory of general relativity.

In Newton's law, it is the proportionality constant connecting the gravitational force between two bodies with the product of their masses and the inverse square of their distance. In the Einstein field equations, it quantifies the relation between the geometry of spacetime and the energy–momentum tensor (also referred to as the stress–energy tensor).

The measured value of the constant is known with some certainty to four significant digits. In SI units, its value is approximately 

The modern notation of Newton's law involving  was introduced in the 1890s by C. V. Boys. The first implicit measurement with an accuracy within about 1% is attributed to Henry Cavendish in a 1798 experiment.

Definition
According to Newton's law of universal gravitation, the attractive force between two point-like bodies is directly proportional to the product of their masses ( and ) and inversely proportional to the square of the distance, between their centers of mass:

The constant of proportionality, is the gravitational constant. Colloquially, the gravitational constant is also called "Big G", distinct from "small g", which is the local gravitational field of Earth (equivalent to the free-fall acceleration).

The gravitational constant appears in the Einstein field equations of general relativity,

Value and uncertainty

The gravitational constant is a physical constant that is difficult to measure with high accuracy. This is because the gravitational force is an extremely weak force as compared to other fundamental forces at the laboratory scale.

In SI units, the 2018 Committee on Data for Science and Technology (CODATA)-recommended value of the gravitational constant (with standard uncertainty in parentheses) is:

Natural units
The gravitational constant is a defining constant in some systems of natural units, particularly geometrized unit systems, such as Planck units and Stoney units.  When expressed in terms of such units, the value of the gravitational constant will generally have a numeric value of 1 or a value close to it. Due to the significant uncertainty in the measured value of G in terms of other known fundamental constants, a similar level of uncertainty will show up in the value of many quantities when expressed in such a unit system.

Orbital mechanics

In astrophysics, it is convenient to measure distances in parsecs (pc), velocities in kilometres per second (km/s) and masses in solar units . In these units, the gravitational constant is:

For situations where tides are important, the relevant length scales are solar radii rather than parsecs. In these units, the gravitational constant is:

In orbital mechanics, the period  of an object in circular orbit around a spherical object obeys

where  is the volume inside the radius of the orbit. It follows that

This way of expressing  shows the relationship between the average density of a planet and the period of a satellite orbiting just above its surface.

For elliptical orbits, applying Kepler's 3rd law, expressed in units characteristic of Earth's orbit:
 
where distance is measured in terms of the semi-major axis of Earth's orbit (the astronomical unit, AU), time in years, and mass in the total mass of the orbiting system.

The above equation is exact only within the approximation of the Earth's orbit around the Sun as a two-body problem in Newtonian mechanics, the measured quantities contain corrections from the perturbations from other bodies in the solar system and from general relativity.

From 1964 until 2012, however, it was used as the definition of the astronomical unit and thus held by definition: 
 
Since 2012, the AU is defined as  exactly, and the equation can no longer be taken as holding precisely.

The quantity —the product of the gravitational constant and the mass of a given astronomical body such as the Sun or Earth—is known as the standard gravitational parameter (also denoted ). The standard gravitational parameter  appears as above in Newton's law of universal gravitation, as well as in formulas for the deflection of light caused by gravitational lensing, in Kepler's laws of planetary motion, and in the formula for escape velocity.

This quantity gives a convenient simplification of various gravity-related formulas. The product  is known much more accurately than either factor is.

Calculations in celestial mechanics can also be carried out using the units of solar masses, mean solar days and astronomical units rather than standard SI units. For this purpose, the Gaussian gravitational constant was historically in widespread use, expressing the mean angular velocity of the Sun–Earth system measured in radians per day. The use of this constant, and the implied definition of the astronomical unit discussed above, has been deprecated by the IAU since 2012.

History of measurement

Early history

The existence of the constant is implied in Newton's law of universal gravitation as published in the 1680s (although its notation as  dates to the 1890s), but is not calculated in his Philosophiæ Naturalis Principia Mathematica where it postulates the inverse-square law of gravitation. In the Principia, Newton considered the possibility of measuring gravity's strength by measuring the deflection of a pendulum in the vicinity of a large hill, but thought that the effect would be too small to be measurable. Nevertheless, he had the opportunity to estimate the order of magnitude of the constant when he surmised that "the mean density of the earth might be five or six times as great as the density of water", which is equivalent to a gravitational constant of the order:

 ≈ 

A measurement was attempted in 1738 by Pierre Bouguer and Charles Marie de La Condamine in their "Peruvian expedition". Bouguer downplayed the significance of their results in 1740, suggesting that the experiment had at least proved that the Earth could not be a hollow shell, as some thinkers of the day, including Edmond Halley, had suggested.

The Schiehallion experiment, proposed in 1772 and completed in 1776, was the first successful measurement of the mean density of the Earth, and thus indirectly of the gravitational constant. This immediately led to estimates on the densities and masses of the Sun, Moon and planets, sent by Hutton to Jérôme Lalande for inclusion in his planetary tables. As discussed above, establishing the average density of Earth is equivalent to measuring the gravitational constant, given Earth's mean radius and the mean gravitational acceleration at Earth's surface, by setting

Based on this, Hutton's 1778 result is equivalent to  ≈ .

The first direct measurement of gravitational attraction between two bodies in the laboratory was performed in 1798, seventy-one years after Newton's death, by Henry Cavendish. He determined a value for  implicitly, using a torsion balance invented by the geologist Rev. John Michell (1753). He used a horizontal torsion beam with lead balls whose inertia (in relation to the torsion constant) he could tell by timing the beam's oscillation. Their faint attraction to other balls placed alongside the beam was detectable by the deflection it caused. In spite of the experimental design being due to Michell, the experiment is now known as the Cavendish experiment for its first successful execution by Cavendish.

Cavendish's stated aim was the "weighing of Earth", that is, determining the average density of Earth and the Earth's mass. His result, ρ🜨 = , corresponds to value of  = . It is surprisingly accurate, about 1% above the modern value (comparable to the claimed standard uncertainty of 0.6%).

19th century
The accuracy of the measured value of  has increased only modestly since the original Cavendish experiment.  is quite difficult to measure because gravity is much weaker than other fundamental forces, and an experimental apparatus cannot be separated from the gravitational influence of other bodies.

Measurements with pendulums were made by Francesco Carlini (1821), Edward Sabine (1827), Carlo Ignazio Giulio (1841) and George Biddell Airy (1854).

Cornu and Baille (1873), found .

Cavendish's experiment proved to result in more reliable measurements than pendulum experiments of the "Schiehallion" (deflection) type or "Peruvian" (period as a function of altitude) type. Pendulum experiments still continued to be performed, by Robert von Sterneck (1883, results between 5.0 and ) and Thomas Corwin Mendenhall (1880).

In addition to Poynting, measurements were made by C. V. Boys (1895) and Carl Braun (1897), with compatible results suggesting  = . The modern notation involving the constant  was introduced by Boys in 1894 and becomes standard by the end of the 1890s, with values usually cited in the cgs system. Richarz and Krigar-Menzel (1898) attempted a repetition of the Cavendish experiment using 100,000 kg of lead for the attracting mass.

Arthur Stanley Mackenzie in The Laws of Gravitation (1899) reviews the work done in the 19th century. Poynting is the author of the article "Gravitation" in the Encyclopædia Britannica Eleventh Edition (1911). Here, he cites a value of  =  with an uncertainty of 0.2%.

Modern value

Published values of  derived from high-precision measurements since the 1950s have remained compatible with Heyl (1930), but within the relative uncertainty of about 0.1% (or 1,000 ppm) have varied rather broadly, and it is not entirely clear if the uncertainty has been reduced at all since the 1942 measurement. Some measurements published in the 1980s to 2000s were, in fact, mutually exclusive.

By 1969, the value recommended by the National Institute of Standards and Technology (NIST) was cited with a standard uncertainty of 0.046% (460 ppm), lowered to 0.012% (120 ppm) by 1986. But the continued publication of conflicting measurements led NIST to considerably increase the standard uncertainty in the 1998 recommended value, by a factor of 12, to a standard uncertainty of 0.15%, larger than the one given by Heyl (1930).

The uncertainty was again lowered in 2002 and 2006, but once again raised, by a more conservative 20%, in 2010, matching the standard uncertainty of 120 ppm published in 1986. For the 2014 update, CODATA reduced the uncertainty to 46 ppm, less than half the 2010 value, and one order of magnitude below the 1969 recommendation.

The following table shows the NIST recommended values published since 1969:

Although much closer to the accepted value (suggesting that the Fixler et al. measurement was erroneous), this result was 325 ppm below the recommended 2014 CODATA value, with non-overlapping standard uncertainty intervals.

As of 2018, efforts to re-evaluate the conflicting results of measurements are underway, coordinated by NIST, notably a repetition of the experiments reported by Quinn et al. (2013).

In August 2018, a Chinese research group announced new measurements based on torsion balances,  and  based on two different methods. These are claimed as the most accurate measurements ever made, with a standard uncertainties cited as low as 12 ppm. The difference of 2.7σ between the two results suggests there could be sources of error unaccounted for.

Suggested time-variation

A response was produced by some of the original authors of the  measurements used in Anderson et al. This response notes that Anderson et al. not only omitted measurements, but that they also used the time of publication rather than the time the experiments were performed. A plot with estimated time of measurement from contacting original authors seriously degrades the length of day correlation. Also, consideration of the data collected over a decade by Karagioz and Izmailov shows no correlation with length of day measurements. As such, the variations in  most likely arise from systematic measurement errors which have not properly been accounted for. Under the assumption that the physics of type Ia supernovae are universal, analysis of observations of 580 of them has shown that the gravitational constant has varied by less than one part in ten billion per year over the last nine billion years according to Mould et al. (2014).

See also

Gravity of Earth
Standard gravity
Gaussian gravitational constant
Orbital mechanics
Escape velocity
Gravitational potential
Gravitational wave
Strong gravitational constant
Dirac large numbers hypothesis
Accelerating universe
Lunar Laser Ranging experiment
Cosmological constant

References
Footnotes

Citations

Sources

 (Complete report available online: PostScript; PDF. Tables from the report also available: Astrodynamic Constants and Parameters)

External links
 Newtonian constant of gravitation  at the National Institute of Standards and Technology References on Constants, Units, and Uncertainty
 The Controversy over Newton's Gravitational Constant — additional commentary on measurement problems

Gravity
Fundamental constants